is an Echizen Railway Katsuyama Eiheiji Line railway station located in Katsuyama, Fukui Prefecture, Japan.

Lines

Station layout
The station consists of one side platform serving a single bi-directional track. The station is unattended.

Adjacent stations

History
Hishima Station was opened on May 1, 1931. Operations were halted from June 25, 2001. The station reopened on October 19, 2003 as an Echizen Railway station.

Passenger statistics
In fiscal 2016, the station was used by an average of 8 passengers daily (boarding passengers only).

Surrounding area
The station is in the middle of a small residential area. The Hishima Citizens' Hall is 100 meters south.
The Kuzuryū River and Fukui Prefectural Route 168 pass to the north.

See also
 List of railway stations in Japan

References

External links

  

Railway stations in Fukui Prefecture
Railway stations in Japan opened in 1931
Katsuyama Eiheiji Line
Katsuyama, Fukui